Cryptolepis  may refer to:
 Cryptolepis (fish), an extinct fish genus from the Devonian
 Cryptolepis (plant), a plant genus